Perreología is the fifth studio album by the Puerto Rican reggaeton duo Alexis & Fido released on January 14, 2012 through Wild Dogz Music and Sony Music Latin. It was nominated for a Lo Nuestro Award for Urban Album of the Year.

Track listing
1-19 is as listed below

 La Intelectual
 Blam Blam (feat. Cosculluela)
 Deja Ver (feat. Tony Dize)
 Rescate (feat. Daddy Yankee)
 Contestame El Teléfono (feat. Flex)
 Energía
 La Trampa (feat. Eddie Avila)
 Donde Estés Llegaré
 Yo Sé Que Quieres (feat. Nova & Jory)
 Como El Primer Beso
 Bailando La Encontré
 Camuflaje
 Zombie (feat. Yaviah)
 Mala Conducta (feat. Franco El Gorila)
 Blam Blam (feat. Cosculluela, Ñengo Flow)
 Energía (feat. Wisin & Yandel)
 Donde Estés Llegaré (feat. J Balvin)
 Camuflaje (feat. Arcangel & De La Ghetto)
 Mala Conducta (feat. Franco El Gorila, Arcangel & De La Ghetto)

Singles
 Rescate (feat. Daddy Yankee)
 Contestame El Teléfono (feat. Flex)
 Energía
 Donde Estés Llegaré

Charts

Weekly charts

Year-end charts

Album certifications

References

2011 albums
Alexis & Fido albums